Witness is a 2022 Indian Tamil-language drama film directed by Deepak. The film stars Shraddha Srinath and Rohini in leading roles. It was released on 9 December 2022 in Sony LIV.

Cast
Shraddha Srinath as Parvathy
Rohini as Indrani
Subatra Robert
Azhagam Perumal
Shanmugarajan as Sivaprakasam
G. Selva as Petharaj
Rajeev Anand
Thamizharasan as Parthiban

Production
The shoot of the film was completed by December 2021, with the title revealed in May 2022.

Reception
The film was released on SonyLIV on 9 December 2022. A critic from The Hindu gave the film a positive review noting it was "a powerful anti-caste film that doesn’t pull any punches" and that "through powerful storytelling, debutant director Deepak and writer Muthuvel’s film raises important questions and shows the sheer savagery that we, the collective society, are ‘witness’ to". A reviewer from The Hindustan Times called it "a hard-hitting social drama on the horrors of manual scavenging". A critic from The New Indian Express wrote that "Witness will be long remembered for the kind of conversations the women have in the film".

References

External links

2022 films
2020s Tamil-language films
Indian drama films
2022 directorial debut films
Films about social issues in India
SonyLIV original films
Caste system in India
Caste System
Indian caste system